Dhing is a town in the northwest of the Nagaon district in the state of Assam, India.

Geography
It has an average elevation of 64 meters (210 feet).

Dhing is approximately 25 kilometers from the city of Nagaon.

Demographics
In the 2011 India census, Dhing had a population of 19,235. Males constituted 51.7% of the population and females 48.3%. Dhing had an average literacy rate of 87.35%, higher than the state average of 72.19%. Male literacy is 90.77% and female literacy is 83.69%.

Politics
The Communist leader M. Shamsul Huda was elected several times to the Assam Legislative Assembly as the member for the Dhing legislative assembly constituency. Dhing is part of the Kaliabor (Lok Sabha constituency).

Dhing constituency is currently represented by an All India United Democratic Front politician, Aminul Islam, who has won the last two Assam Legislative Assembly elections in 2011 and 2016.

Education 
Dhing serves as an educational hub for surrounding villages and services multiple secondary schools. It also provides post-secondary education with Dhing College, which is affiliated with Gauhati University.

Notable people 
Hima Das, first Indian woman to win a gold medal at the IAAF World Under-20 Athletics   Championships
Mufti Khairul Islam, Ex Amir-e-Shariat of North East India
Ratnakanta Borkakati, Assamese poet
Rajdweep, lyricist, playwright, screenwriter, and journalist

See also
Dhing Express, nickname for Hima Das

References

Cities and towns in Nagaon district